Jennifer Kelly (born June 1970) is an English former heptathlete who represented Great Britain at the 1988 World Junior Championships and the 1990 European Championships. Representing England, she finished fifth at the 1994 Commonwealth Games. She finished second at the AAA Championships in 1991 and 1995. Her heptathlon best of 5826 points in 1994, still ranks her in the UK all-time top 20.

International competitions

References

1970 births
English heptathletes
Athletes (track and field) at the 1994 Commonwealth Games
Living people
Commonwealth Games competitors for England